Moshe Shlomovich (born 1949) is a former Israeli footballer who played for Maccabi Netanya.

He is the younger brother of Eliezer Shlomovich.

Honours
Israeli Premier League (2):
1970-71, 1973-74

References

1949 births
Living people
Israeli Jews
Israeli footballers
Maccabi Netanya F.C. players
Association footballers not categorized by position